Pollachi is a Lok Sabha constituency in Tamil Nadu. Its Tamil Nadu Parliamentary Constituency number is 21 of 39.

Assembly segments

2009-present

Before 2009
Kinathukkadavu
Pollachi
Valparai (SC)
Udumalpet
Pongalur
Dharapuram (moved to Erode constituency after 2009)

Members of the Parliament

Election results

General Election 2019

General Election 2014

General Election 2009

General Election 2004

See also
 List of Constituencies of the Lok Sabha

References

 http://results.eci.gov.in/pc/en/constituencywise/ConstituencywiseS2221.htm?ac=21

External links
Pollachi lok sabha  constituency election 2019 date and schedule

Lok Sabha constituencies in Tamil Nadu